Tajemství rodu (The secret of the lineage) is the Czech version of the British genealogy documentary series Who Do You Think You Are? Starting on 9 January 2013, the Czech broadcaster Česká televize, aired 13 episodes on the ČT1.

Episodes

Series 1 (2013)
 (9 January 2013)
Veronika Freimanová (16 January)
Michal Viewegh (23 January)
Květa Fialová (30 January)
 (6 February)
 (13 February)
Viktor Preiss (20 February)
David Koller (27 February)
Halina Pawlowská (13 March)
Tereza Kostková (20 March)
Tomáš Halík (27 March)
Radoslav Banga (3 April)
 (10 April)

Series 2 (2015)
Jiřina Bohdalová (1 September 2015)
Jaromír Hanzlík (8 September)
Natálie Kocábová (15 September)
Miroslav Donutil (22 September)
 (29 September)
Jiří Mádl (6 October)
 (13 October)
Barbora Poláková (20 October)
Matěj Ruppert (27 October)

External links

 
  Tajemství rodu at Česká televize
  Tajemství rodu at The Czech Genealogy and Heraldry Society in Prague

2013 Czech television series debuts
Television series about family history
Czech Television original programming
Czech genealogy
Czech documentary television series